Eynez Coal Mine, also known as Soma Coal Mine, is a disused coal mine in Turkey near the town of Soma in Manisa Province. The mine, a public property owned by TKI, was operated by the private sector company Soma Kömür İşletmeleri A.Ş. In May 2014 the Soma mine disaster took place in the mine, killing 301 people. In May 2018 TKI attempted to retender the operating licence.

References

External links 

 Eynez coal mine on Global Energy Monitor

Coal mines in Turkey
Manisa Province
Soma District